Xcite (part of Alghanim Industries) is an electronics store currently based in Kuwait. Their product line includes computers & tablets, mobile phones, cameras, TVs, gaming products, major appliances, small appliances, perfumes, watches and gift cards. 

Xcite Kuwait has 45 showrooms located in different areas in Kuwait - Sultan Center Hawally Express, Sultan Center Sulaibiya Express, Sultan Center Salmiya Express , Sultan Center Shuwaikh Express, Sultan Center Souq Sharq Mall, Sultan Center Mangaf Express, Sultan Center Al Kout Mall, Sultan Center Aqeelah Arabia Mall, Sultan Center Boulevard Mall, Sultan Center Jahra Mall Of the Tent, Sultan Center Dajeej Mall, 360 Mall Basement, City Centre Salmiya Main, City Centre Dajeej, City Centre Shuwaikh, City Centre Jahra, City Centre Dasma, Fahaheel Industrial, Al Rai, Fahaheel, Hawally, Farwaniya, Qurain CO-OP, Salmiya Main, Jahra, Jleeb Al-Shuyoukh, The Avenues (Kuwait) Mall, Baitek Tower, Jabriya CO-OP Express, Khaldiya CO-OP Express, Marina Mall Express, Fintas (Liwan Mall), Sahari Mall, Cube Mall, Shuwaikh Plot 101 Express, Khaitan Sama Center, Mekhyal Mall, Al Kout Mall 2, Gate Mall, Avenues Electra Phrase 4, Kuwait International Airport Terminal 1,Jazeera Airport Terminal 5, Assima Mall, Al Rai Express.   

Xcite Saudi Arabia has 4 showrooms located in different areas in Riyadh, King Abdullah Road, Granada District, Khurais Road and Imall.

On Tuesday, 7 November 2017, Alghanim Industries, one of the largest privately owned companies in the region, inaugurated its brand new X-cite and Safat Home showroom in Al Jahra, Kuwait.

E-Commerce Portal 
In December 2011, X-cite launched their e-commerce portal xcite.com. in Kuwait and xcite.com.sa in KSA

Awards 
X-cite has received the following awards:

 Best Retailer 2010’ by the Middle East Retail Academy Awards 
 ‘Best Retailer’ and ‘Best Retail IT Executive’ by the 2011 Middle East Retail Academy Awards
 ‘Best Retailer’ and ‘Best Retail IT Executive’ by the 2012 Middle East Retail Academy Awards 
 Facebook ‘Best Interactive Award’ for the electronics category in the GCC region by the Pan Arab Web Awards Academy 
 ‘Best Overall Retailer’ by the Gamestream 12 Awards 
 ‘Best In-Store Experience of the Year 2012’ by Middle East Retail Academy Awards
 ‘Best Post Paid Sales 2012’ award from VIVA Telecom

References

Retail companies of Kuwait